Eva González Fernández (17 January 1918 – 25 April 2007) was a Leonese language writer; she was born in Palacios del Sil (León Province, Spain) in 1918 and died in León in 2007. She has a dedicated street in León by her contribution to the literature in Leonese.

She wrote:

 Poesías ya cuentus na nuesa tsingua (1980).
 Bitsarón. Cousas pa nenos y pa grandes na nuesa tsingua (1981).
 Xentiquina (1983).
 Xeitus: poesías ya cuentus (1985).
 Branas d'antanu ya xente d'anguanu: poesías ya cuentus (1990) reedited (2003)

Collective books:

 Cuentos de Lleón (1996)
 Cuentos del Sil (2006)
 El Dialecto Leonés, edición conmemorativa (2006)

References

 Leonese language
 List of Leonese language writers
 Kingdom of León
 Cuentos del Sil

External links
 Asociación Berciana en defensa de la Llingua Llïonesa El Toralín (in Leonese language)
 Asociación Cultural de la Llingua Llïonesa El Fueyu (in Leonese language and English)
 del Sil Cuentos del Sil (in Leonese language)
 Top Level Domain for Leonese Language (in Leonese language and several more)

1918 births
2007 deaths
People from El Bierzo
Leonese-language writers